Ultimate Fight Night 4 was a mixed martial arts event held by the Ultimate Fighting Championship on April 6, 2006. The event took place at Hard Rock Hotel and Casino, in Las Vegas, Nevada and was broadcast live on Spike TV in the United States and Canada.  The show drew a 1.6 overall rating and served as the lead-in for the season three premiere episode of The Ultimate Fighter.


Results

Bonus Awards

Fight of the Night: Brad Imes vs. Dan Christison
Submission of the Night: Dan Christison

Reported payouts

Stephan Bonnar: $24,000

Luke Cummo: $24,000

Rashad Evans: $24,000

Josh Koscheck: $14,000

Chris Leben: $14,000

Joe Stevenson: $12,000

Josh Neer: $8,000

Jon Fitch: $8,000

Sam Hoger: $7,000

Dan Christison: $6,000 

Brad Imes: $6,000

Chael Sonnen: $6,000

Trevor Prangley: $6,000 

Jason Von Flue: $5,000

Luigi Fioravanti: $5,000

Keith Jardine: $5,000

Josh Burkman: $5,000

Ansar Chalangov: $2,000

Disclosed Fighter Payroll: $181,000

See also
 Ultimate Fighting Championship
 List of UFC champions
 List of UFC events
 2006 in UFC

References

External links
Ultimate Fight Night 4 Ratings Down from Previous Live Fight Specials
UFC Fighter Salaries for 2006 (includes fighter salaries for Ultimate Fight Night 4)

UFC Fight Night
2006 in mixed martial arts
Mixed martial arts in Las Vegas
2006 in sports in Nevada
Hard Rock Hotel and Casino (Las Vegas)